Katjunagar is a neighbourhood located in South Kolkata in the city of Kolkata, West Bengal, India. The adjacent neighbourhoods to the locality include Jadavpur, South City, Poddar Nagar, Jodhpur Park, Lake Gardens, Bikramgarh and Golf Green.

Some important institutes in and around the locality include Central Glass and Ceramic Research Institute, Regional Institute of Printing Technology, APC Polytechnic, Indian Association for the Cultivation of Science, Jadavpur University, Indian Institute of Chemical Biology, etc.
It is well known for its proximity to South City Mall, Jadavpur University, Gariahat, Prince Anwar Shah Road, Jadavpur railway station and 8B Bus Stand.

References

External links

Neighbourhoods in Kolkata